Yours, Mine & Ours is the third studio album by American indie rock band Pernice Brothers. It was released by Ashmont Records on May 20, 2003. It peaked at number 34 on the UK Independent Albums Chart. In 2009, Sherwin-Williams used "The Weakest Shade of Blue" in its ad campaign.

Track listing

Personnel
Credits adapted from liner notes.

Musicians
 Joe Pernice – performance
 Thom Monahan – performance
 Peyton Pinkerton – performance
 Mike Belitsky – performance
 Laura Stein – performance
 Bob Pernice – performance
 Mike Daly – additional performance
 Ben Wheelock – additional performance
 John Crooke – additional performance
 Warren Zanes – additional performance
 April March – additional performance

Technical personnel
 Thom Monahan – production, recording, mixing
 Joe Pernice – production
 Ken Heitmuller – mixing
 Jeff Lipton – mastering
 Kenyon King – technical support
 Marc Moorash – technical support
 Laura Stein – package design
 Pernice Brothers – band photography

Charts

References

External links
 
 

2003 albums
Pernice Brothers albums
Albums produced by Thom Monahan